Andajes District is one of six districts of the province Oyón in Peru.

It is located in the northern highlands of the department of Lima Province Oyón 23 km to the NW of the town of Churín at an altitud of 3,487 meters.

Andajes historic village the land of "Martyrs of Democracy" cradle of delicacies called by the investigator Antonio Raimondi "Balcony of the Andes". It was created politically January 2, 1857, by General Ramón Castilla. Currently there are annexes: La Chimba and San Benito.

Etymologically the term Andajes place names comer from two Quechua. "Anta" means copper and "Jaja" or "casha" which means thorn. Another version is that it was named by Spanish Andaxes and eventually led to Andajes.

References

External links
 [ Andajes District Municipality]
  [Lima Regional Government - Tourism - Andajes]
 [Rural Webside Andajes Lima (Perú)]
 [Map of travelers - Andajes (Perú)]
 [Traveler daily - Andajes (Perú)]
  [Hotels, ecotourism, rented rooms, hostels, bed & breakfast Andajes (Perú)]
 [Church - Andajes (Perú)]
  [Education - Andajes (Perú)]
 [Water Festival - Andajes (Perú)]
  [Folkloric songs - Andajes (Perú)]
 [Blancmange Festival - Andajes (Perú)]
 [Water festival pictures - Andajes (Perú)]
 [Caporales Party- Andajes (Perú)]
 [Additional axes - Peru Truth Commission Report]
 [Sol de oro and other memories - En Andajes]
 [Map - Andajes]
 [Archaeological Complex Antashuay - Andajes]
  [Archaeological site Antashuay - Andajes]
  [Traveler  Pictures Churín 2010 - Antashuay - Andajes]
 [Churín Spa]

1857 establishments in Peru